Drumoyne is now a district in the Scottish city of Glasgow. It is situated south of the River Clyde and is part of the former Burgh of Govan.

It is the birthplace of Sir Alex Ferguson, manager of Manchester United football club since November 1986 and now the most successful manager in English football. He was born at 357 Shieldhall Road on 31 December 1941, the home of his grandparents, although he grew up at a tenement in nearby Govan. His birthplace still exists today.

References 

Areas of Glasgow
Govan